Cultural nationalism is nationalism in which the nation is defined by a shared culture and a common language, rather than on the concepts of common ancestry or race.

Cultural nationalism does not tend to manifest itself in independent movements, but is usually a moderate position within a larger spectrum of nationalist ideology.
Thus, moderate positions in Flemish or Hindu nationalisms might be "cultural nationalism", while these same movements also include forms of ethnic nationalism and national mysticism.

Membership in the nation is neither entirely voluntary (one cannot instantly acquire a culture), nor hereditary (children of members may be considered foreigners if they grew up in another culture).

Therefore, if a person is from a nation but their child grew up in another culture, then despite that person's nationality, their child is considered to be from the nationality of the culture they grew up in, and must learn their parent's culture in order to be a member of their parent's nationality (even though that parent's child is a citizen of their nation). Thus, cultural nationality is not achieved through citizenship as in civic nationalism.

Literature
David Aberbach, 2008, Jewish Cultural Nationalism: Origins and Influences, 
Kosaku Yoshino, 1992, Cultural Nationalism in Contemporary Japan: A Sociological Enquiry, 
J. Ellen Gainor, 2001, Performing America: Cultural Nationalism in American Theater, 
G. Gordon Betts, 2002, The Twilight of Britain: Cultural Nationalism, Multiculturalism, and the Politics of Toleration, 
Yingjie Guo, 2004, Cultural Nationalism in Contemporary China: The Search for National Identity under Reform, 
Mike Featherstone, 1990, Global Culture: Nationalism, Globalization and Modernity, 
Starrs, Roy, 2004, 
Vincent Martigny, 2016, Dire la France. Culture(s) et identités nationales,

References

External links
Cultural Nationalism

Nationalism
Culture

de:Kulturnation